Alfred Dillon Pankhurst (1878 – 1936) was an English footballer who played at centre-forward for Burslem Port Vale in 1900 and 1901.

Career
Pankhurst played for Smallthorne, before joining Burslem Port Vale in May 1900. After making his debut in a goalless draw with Glossop at the Athletic Ground on 29 September, he only managed four further Second Division appearances before being released at the end of the season.

Career statistics
Source:

References

1878 births
1936 deaths
Sportspeople from Burslem
English footballers
Association football forwards
Port Vale F.C. players
English Football League players